Şaqela (also Romanized as Shaqala; also known as Gol qal'eh and Shāh Qal‘eh) is a village in chl chama Rural District, in the Central District of Divandarreh County, Kurdistan Province, Iran. At the 2006 census, its population was 382, in 75 families. The village is populated by Kurds.

References 

Towns and villages in Divandarreh County
Kurdish settlements in Kurdistan Province